Dan Footman (born January 13, 1969, in Tampa, Florida) is a former American football defensive lineman in the National Football League.

Collegiate career
He played college football at Florida State. He started out as an Outside Linebacker in 1990 before being switched to Defensive End for the 1991 and 1992 seasons.

He would finish his career with 102 tackles, 7 tackles for loss, and 8.5 Sacks including 4 in 11 games as a Senior.

NFL career
He was drafted by the Cleveland Browns in the second round of the 1993 NFL Draft.  Footman also played for the Baltimore Ravens and Indianapolis Colts.

While playing under Bill Belichick, Footman accumulated 8.5 Sacks over 3 seasons including 5.0 in 16 starts during the 1995 season.  In 1997, he went to the Indianapolis Colts and recorded a career best 10.5 Sacks in 10 starts. He made just 3 starts in 1998 before retiring due to injury.

References

1969 births
Living people
American football defensive tackles
American football defensive ends
Northwest Mississippi Rangers football players
Florida State Seminoles football players
Cleveland Browns players
Baltimore Ravens players
Indianapolis Colts players
Players of American football from Tampa, Florida